The Ishimori equation is a partial differential equation proposed by the Japanese mathematician . Its interest is as the first example of a nonlinear spin-one field model in the plane that is integrable .

Equation
The Ishimori equation has the form

Lax representation

The Lax representation

of the equation is given by

Here

Reductions
The Ishimori equation admits an important reduction:
in 1+1 dimensions it reduces to the continuous classical Heisenberg ferromagnet equation (CCHFE). The CCHFE is integrable.

Equivalent counterpart
The equivalent counterpart of the Ishimori equation is the Davey-Stewartson equation.

See also

 Nonlinear Schrödinger equation
 Heisenberg model (classical)
 Spin wave
 Landau–Lifshitz model
 Soliton
 Vortex
 Nonlinear systems
 Davey–Stewartson equation

References

External links
Ishimori_system at the dispersive equations wiki

Electric and magnetic fields in matter
Partial differential equations
Integrable systems